Anzhelika Aleksandrovna Sidorova (born 28 June 1991) is a Russian pole vaulter. Sidorova won a gold medal at the 2019 World Championships and a silver medal at the 2020 Summer Olympics. She also won silver medals at the 2014 IAAF World Indoor Championships and 2013 European Athletics U23 Championships, and a bronze medal at the 2013 European Athletics Indoor Championships. 

Sidorova's personal best is 5.01 m, set at the 2021 Zurich Diamond League finals, becoming one of only three women in the world to clear 5 metres outdoors.

International competitions

Awards
In the 2020 edition of the national sports award Pride of Russia, in the nomination Sportswoman of the Year

References

External links

Living people
1991 births
Athletes from Moscow
Russian female pole vaulters
World Athletics Championships athletes for Russia
Authorised Neutral Athletes at the World Athletics Championships
World Athletics Championships winners
World Athletics Championships medalists
IAAF Continental Cup winners
European Athletics Championships winners
European Athletics Championships medalists
European Athletics Indoor Championships winners
Russian Athletics Championships winners
Athletes (track and field) at the 2020 Summer Olympics
Medalists at the 2020 Summer Olympics
Olympic silver medalists for the Russian Olympic Committee athletes
Olympic silver medalists in athletics (track and field)
Olympic athletes of Russia
Diamond League winners